Clinton is a small town in South Otago, in New Zealand's South Island. Handy to the Catlins, Dunedin, Lawrence, Central Otago and Tapanui. It is located on State Highway 1 approximately halfway between Balclutha and Gore (the section of State Highway 1 between Clinton and Gore is known as "The Presidential Highway", after Bill Clinton and Al Gore, though the names are a coincidence), and the Main South Line railway passes through the town.

Clinton was named for Henry Pelham-Clinton, 5th Duke of Newcastle, former British Secretary of State for the Colonies.

Demographics
Clinton town is described by Statistics New Zealand as a rural settlement.

Clinton had a population of 288 at the 2018 New Zealand census, an increase of 3 people (1.1%) since the 2013 census, and a decrease of 3 people (−1.0%) since the 2006 census. There were 117 households. There were 147 males and 141 females, giving a sex ratio of 1.04 males per female, with 48 people (16.7%) aged under 15 years, 51 (17.7%) aged 15 to 29, 120 (41.7%) aged 30 to 64, and 63 (21.9%) aged 65 or older.

Ethnicities were 83.3% European/Pākehā, 26.0% Māori, 2.1% Asian, and 4.2% other ethnicities (totals add to more than 100% since people could identify with multiple ethnicities).

Although some people objected to giving their religion, 54.2% had no religion, 32.3% were Christian, 1.0% were Hindu, 1.0% were Buddhist and 2.1% had other religions.

Of those at least 15 years old, 15 (6.2%) people had a bachelor or higher degree, and 93 (38.8%) people had no formal qualifications. The employment status of those at least 15 was that 99 (41.2%) people were employed full-time, 42 (17.5%) were part-time, and 12 (5.0%) were unemployed.

Clinton statistical area

Clinton statistical area had a population of 1,230 at the 2018 New Zealand census, an increase of 30 people (2.5%) since the 2013 census, and an increase of 60 people (5.1%) since the 2006 census. There were 465 households. There were 648 males and 579 females, giving a sex ratio of 1.12 males per female. The median age was 33.8 years (compared with 37.4 years nationally), with 288 people (23.4%) aged under 15 years, 255 (20.7%) aged 15 to 29, 555 (45.1%) aged 30 to 64, and 132 (10.7%) aged 65 or older.

Ethnicities were 87.3% European/Pākehā, 11.5% Māori, 1.7% Pacific peoples, 5.4% Asian, and 3.4% other ethnicities (totals add to more than 100% since people could identify with multiple ethnicities).

The proportion of people born overseas was 12.2%, compared with 27.1% nationally.

Although some people objected to giving their religion, 52.2% had no religion, 35.9% were Christian, 0.5% were Hindu, 1.7% were Buddhist and 2.0% had other religions.

Of those at least 15 years old, 132 (14.0%) people had a bachelor or higher degree, and 231 (24.5%) people had no formal qualifications. The median income was $35,200, compared with $31,800 nationally. 99 people (10.5%) earned over $70,000 compared to 17.2% nationally. The employment status of those at least 15 was that 564 (59.9%) people were employed full-time, 180 (19.1%) were part-time, and 21 (2.2%) were unemployed.

Education

The school was established in 1874.

Railway station 
Clinton railway station opened on 1 November 1877 and closed for passengers on 1 December 1970 and for goods in October 1990. The 4th class station had a refreshment room from 1880, which, included a bar and, like most rooms, had its marked crockery. The station and refreshment room burnt down in 1900, but was quickly rebuilt. The engine shed burnt down in 1921 and the station was again damaged by fire in 1982. The turntable was lengthened in 1939 and removed in 1969. In 1931 the station still had a refreshment room and employed a stationmaster and two clerks.

References

Clutha District
Populated places in Otago